Stonyfield Farm, also simply called Stonyfield, is an organic yogurt maker and dairy company located in Londonderry, New Hampshire, United States. Stonyfield Farm was founded by Samuel Kaymen in 1983, on a 19th-century farmstead in Wilton, New Hampshire, as an organic farming school. The company makes the second leading brand of organic yogurt in North America, with 13.3% of the market.

The company is owned by the second largest dairy company in the world, the French group Lactalis.

History

In 2001, Groupe Danone, a French food product company whose brands include Evian bottled water and Danone/Dannon yogurt, purchased an initial 40% of Stonyfield shares. This was followed with additional purchases such that Group Danone owned the entire company by 2014. 

Gary Hirshberg is chairman and former president and CEO of Stonyfield Farm. Through its Profits for the Planet program, Stonyfield gives 10% of profits to environmental causes. Its milk comes from New England and Midwest dairy farmers through the CROPP (Organic Valley) cooperative.

In 2003, Stonyfield Farm acquired Brown Cow.

In 2006, Stonyfield entered the French market with its Les 2 Vaches (The Two Cows) brand. It also expanded to Canada, with yogurt produced in Quebec. In June 2007, Stonyfield Farm launched its first brand in the UK, Stony, Yogurt on a Mission, though the line has since been discontinued. An organic yogurt brand named Glenisk, however, was successfully launched in Ireland.

On March 31, 2017, Groupe Danone announced its intention to sell the Stonyfield subsidiary to avoid antitrust claims and to clear the way for the acquisition of more significant U.S. organic food producer WhiteWave Foods. In July 2017 it was announced that Danone had agreed to sell Stonyfield to Lactalis for $875 million. The sale was completed and Stonyfield is now entirely owned by a second French dairy giant.

Legal Issues 
Emails leaked by WikiLeaks revealed that Stonyfield chairman Gary Hirshberg lobbied John Podesta, the chairman of Hillary Clinton's presidential campaign, to have Hillary Clinton deliver a strong message in support of mandatory labeling of genetically modified food. As part of the communication, Hirshberg noted that he raised $400,000 for the Clinton campaign.

In response to pressure from regulators to decrease the amount of added sugar in its products, Stonyfield Farm announced a plan to reduce added sugars by 25% in its yogurt line in 2017.

In January 2018, Stonyfield launched an anti-GMO campaign featuring children reading scripted messages of questionable validity. In response to criticism of this ad on their Facebook page, Stonyfield deleted comments, blocked responders, and labeled critics as "trolls" who had violated the company's terms of use.

References

External links

 

 
Brand name yogurts
Certified B Corporations in the Food & Beverage Industry
Organic farming organizations
Dairy products companies of the United States
Companies based in Rockingham County, New Hampshire
Food and drink companies established in 1983
1983 establishments in New Hampshire
Londonderry, New Hampshire
2017 mergers and acquisitions
Lactalis